"Pilot" is the series premiere of the Fox sitcom Raising Hope. The episode was written by series creator, Greg Garcia and directed by Michael Fresco. The episode premiered September 21, 2010, on the Fox television network.

Jimmy Chance, going out to get bubble gum ice-cream, has a one-night stand with a serial killer, resulting in an illegitimate daughter that the mother, Lucy Carlyle, names Princess Beyoncé. When Lucy is convicted of murder and executed, he gets custody of their 6-month-old daughter. He is initially convinced he will be able to raise her on his own; but eventually his family helps out, renaming the baby Hope.

According to Nielsen Media Research, came fourth in its timeslot with a 3.1 rating/8% share in the 19-49 demographic the highest rating for the series.

Plot
After having an affair with a girl named Lucy (Bijou Phillips), 23-year-old Jimmy Chance (Lucas Neff) ends up with a baby. They meet when Jimmy is driving near his house and she runs and enters his van, pleading him to drive away from the man chasing her. He drives her to his house, and in gratitude has a one-night stand with him. The next day, while Lucy is in the bathroom, he and his family hear from the news a picture of Lucy and the news reporter saying that Lucy is a serial killer who murders her boyfriends. The report is shifted to the man who was running after Lucy the night before, who claims that he chased Lucy because she tried to strangle him with her shoelace before she ran to another man's car, and wishes Jimmy luck. The news changes and Lucy enters to eat breakfast, but is hit with the TV by Jimmy's mom, who orders him to call the police.

Eight months later, Lucy calls him into prison, where she reveals that she is pregnant. She happily tells him that she won't be electrocuted because of her pregnancy but dies in the electric chair after she gives birth. Jimmy and their baby watch. After, Jimmy's parents do not want him to keep the baby, named Princess Beyonce, as it is a big burden. The bulk of the show continues with Jimmy trying to prove to be a good parent. This almost fails, until his parents volunteer to help.

At the end of the Episode, they name her Hope.

Production
In June 2009, Fox announced it had booked a put pilot commitment with show creator Greg Garcia. Michael Fresco signed on to direct the pilot in September 2009, which was originally titled Keep Hope Alive.

Casting announcements began in November, with Martha Plimpton and Lucas Neff as the first actors cast. Neff will portray the lead role of 23-year old Jimmy, the father to infant Hope, with Plimpton playing his mother, Virginia.  Olesya Rulin joined the cast shortly thereafter as Sabrina, the new love interest for Jimmy.  Garret Dillahunt came on board in late November to portray Jimmy's father, Burt.

In early December 2009, Kate Micucci was added to the cast as Jimmy's cousin. The role was originally created as a male named Mike. The pilot was filmed in December 2009, with Bijou Phillips as Lucy the serial killer/Hope's mother.

In early spring 2010, reports stated that Cloris Leachman would portray Jimmy's grandmother, Maw Maw. In March, Fox decided to recast two roles from the pilot. Shannon Woodward replaced Olesya Rulin as Sabrina, Jimmy's new love interest. Also recast was the role of Jimmy's cousin, and the role reverted to male with the addition of Skyler Stone as Mike. With this, Kate Micucci's role changed from Jimmy's cousin to become Shelly, the cousin of his love interest Sabrina.

Fox green-lit the pilot to series with an order in mid-May 2010. On May 17, 2010, Fox announced at the upfront presentation that the series, with the new title Raising Hope, was included in its 2010-11 television schedule and set for a fall 2010 premiere.

Cultural references
My Name Is Earl reference: A newscaster in the background reports, "A small-time crook with a long list of wrongs he was making amends for has finally finished, and you'll never guess how it ended." However, the newscast is cut off before we can hear more. This sort of serves as an ending for the series after it was canceled with a To be continued ending.

Reception
In its original American broadcast, "Pilot" was viewed by an estimated 7.48 million viewers with a 3.1 rating/8% share among adults between the ages of 18 and 49. The episode came fourth in its time slot and was the second highest rated show on Fox Broadcasting after Glee episode, "Audition".

Maureen Ryan of TV Squad gave the episode a mixed review saying "Nothing about it is funny and it strands two outstanding actors in a vehicle that fails to harness their many talents." John Kubicek of BuddyTV called the show a "fun little off-beat comedy". Mary McNamara of The Los Angeles Times praised the casting, comparing Martha Plimpton to Rosalind Russell and Eve Arden. Emily VanDerWerff gave a less positive review. She felt that one problem was the casting of Lucas Neff saying "Lucas Neff is such a dozey-eyed and non-essential presence here that every other actor steals the scenes they're in with him". She ultimately rated the episode with a D+.

References

External links
"Pilot" at Internet Movie Database

Raising Hope
2010 American television episodes
Raising Hope episodes